Family No. 1 is  an Indian comedy television series which aired on Sony Entertainment Television from 1998 to 1999, starring Kanwaljeet Singh and Tanvi Azmi.

Synopsis 
The show had two single parents, with three kids each, who end up having to share a newly rented house. Over time, both families go through a series of comic situations and a coming of age of the similarly aged children as they strike friendships and become closer.

A divorcee, Deepak Malhotra and his three kids - Rahul, Rashmi and Guddu live in a beach house which they share with another family the Potia family. The Potia family consists of divorcee Shalini Potia and her three children - Bharti, Toofaan and Dheer.

The story revolves around the two families adjusting and fighting while sharing the same home.

Cast

Main
 Kanwaljeet Singh as Deepak Malhotra
 Tanvi Azmi as Shalini Potia
 Asawari Joshi as Shalini Potia, replaced Tanvi Azmi
 Kabir Sadanand as Rahul Malhotra 
 Aparna Tilak as Rashmi Malhotra
 Vishal Solanki as Guddu
 Umesh Pherwani as Dheer Potia
 Ajay Nagrath as Toofaan Potia
Niyati Rajwade as Bharti Potia

Recurring
Shekhar Shukla as Ramniklal Patel/Patel Uncle
Rajinder Mehra as School Principal
Rajesh Puri as Jaani Bhai, Estate Agent
Shagufta Ali as Jassi, School Principal Wife 
 Vishal Kotian as Mohit, Rashmi's husband
 Ekta Jain

Guest
Sulekha Talwalkar as Sheeba 
Vijay Gokhale as Bholaram 
Rajendra Chawla as Prakash 
Kunika as Shalini 
Viju Khote as Aditya Kapoor 
Ragesh Asthana as Amit Roy 
Daya Shankar Pandey as Pandey 
Gautami Kapoor as Priya, Shalini Younger sister 
Yash Tonk as Raj, Priya friend

References

External links 
 

1998 Indian television series debuts
1999 Indian television series endings
Sony Entertainment Television original programming
Indian comedy television series